Shaune Corrigan (born 7 October 1987) is a rugby league footballer who captains The Entrance Tigers in the NSW Cup. He previously played for the South Sydney Rabbitohs.

Background
Corrigan was born in Gosford, New South Wales, Australia. He has natural red hair and has his entire back tattooed with the southern cross

Playing career
Corrigan, whilst playing for the North Sydney Bears in the NSW Cup competition was selected in the annual NSW Residents clash against Queensland residents in July 2013, playing and scoring a try in the curtain-raiser to the State of Origin decider.  

Corrigan made a total of 26 appearances for South Sydney in the NRL and 63 appearances for North Sydney in the NSW Cup.

References

External links
Shaune Corrigan Official Player Profile
Shaune CORRIGAN at rleague.com
NRL profile

1987 births
Living people
Australian rugby league players
North Sydney Bears NSW Cup players
Rugby league centres
Rugby league wingers
Rugby league players from Gosford, New South Wales
South Sydney Rabbitohs players
Wyong Roos players